This is a list of bridges and other crossings of the Orange River. Locations are listed with the left bank (moving downriver) listed first.

Crossings

Orange
Orange River